The men's combined event at the 2016 World Singles Ninepin Bowling Classic Championships was held in Novigrad, Croatia from 23 May to 28 May 2016.

Results 
The result for the combined was the sum of best results from a single starts in the single classic and sprint.

References 

2016
Men's combined